My Jealous God were a British Indie music band from South London who had a recording career from 1989 to 1992, first on Rough Trade Records and then Fontana Records. The founder and lead singer was Jim Melly. Other band members were Danny Burke (Lead Guitar), Chris O'Donnell (Bass) and Andrew Barkley (Drums).

The band released three singles: "Everything About You" (July 1990), "Pray" (October 1990) and "Easy" (February 1992), made several live appearances, famously once supported by Release at The Venue, New Cross and recorded a session for Mark Goodier's BBC Radio 1 show, but did not release an album. They did, however, record an album that was shelved before it could be released because the group had disbanded. A fourth single, a re-recorded version of "Pray" with new lyrics was pressed but withdrawn (April 1992), although some copies have since surfaced.  A video was released for the original release of "Pray". The band received some criticism for being London-based and appearing to make music similar to the 'Madchester' scene of the time.

Founder Jim Melly became a Professor of Popular Culture and wrote a history of The Faces pop group. Christopher O'Donnell is a journalist for the Tampa Bay Times.

Discography
"Pray" (1990), Rough Trade
"Everything About You" (1990), Rough Trade
"Easy" (1992), Fontana
"Pray" (1992), Fontana

References

External links
Birdpoo (archived)

British indie rock groups
Musical groups from London
Musical groups established in 1989
Musical groups disestablished in 1992